The nine provinces of South Africa are divided into 52 districts (sing. district, ; ; ; ; ; ; ; ;), which are either metropolitan or district municipalities. They are the second level of administrative division, below the provinces and (in the case of district municipalities) above the local municipalities.

As a consequence of the 12th amendment of the Constitution in December 2005, which altered provincial boundaries, the number of districts was reduced from 53. Another effect of the amendment is that each district is now completely contained within a single province, thus eliminating cross-border districts. The districts also cover the entire area of the continental republic.

Types of district
There are two types of municipality at the district level. Most of the country is covered by the 44 district municipalities, which are divided into local municipalities and share responsibilities with them. The eight largest urban agglomerations are governed by metropolitan municipalities, which act as both local and district municipalities.

District municipality
A district municipality or Category C municipality is a municipality which executes some of the functions of local government for a district. The district municipality will in turn comprise several local municipalities, with which it shares the functions of local government. Although the word county is not used in legislation, district municipalities are regularly referred to as such informally. District municipalities are seen as successors to former Regional Services Councils (RSC).

The Constitution, section 155.1.a, defines "Category C" municipalities. The Municipal Structures Act states that areas not eligible to have a metropolitan municipality must have a district municipality.

District municipalities have a municipality code that consists of the letters "DC" followed by a number from 1 to 48. The "DC" reflects the term for the elected political executive "District Councils".

District management areas
Currently all district municipalities are completely divided into local municipalities. However, before the alteration of municipal boundaries which occurred at the 2011 elections, some areas of the country did not fall within any local municipality. This usually occurred in areas with a very low population density, for example national parks and nature reserves. In these areas, which were known as District Management Areas, all local government services were provided by the district municipality.

List
The following map depicts the provinces and districts of South Africa. The district municipalities are labelled with numbers that correspond to their district code, while the metropolitan municipalities are labelled with letters that correspond to their names. Further details of the districts are listed in the table that follows the image.

Boundary alignment
Several projects are underway to align various services with the district boundaries. 
These include:
 Magisterial districts
 Police wards

Controversy
South Africa's official opposition, the Democratic Alliance, believes that the districts add an unnecessary fourth layer of government (between provinces and municipalities) and has called for them to be eliminated.

See also
Municipalities of South Africa
List of municipalities in South Africa
Government of South Africa

References

Sources
 Demarcation Board 
 Government Communication & Information Services (2005) Categories of municipalities
 Parliament of the Republic of South Africa (1996) Constitution of the Republic of South Africa, Chapter 7: Local Government
 Parliament of the Republic of South Africa (1998) Local Government: Municipal Structures Act, Act 117 of 1998.
 South African Local Government Association

 
Subdivisions of South Africa
Lists of subdivisions of South Africa
South Africa 2
Districts, South Africa